Neil McCallum may refer to:

 Neil McCallum (actor), Canadian-British actor
 Neil McCallum (cricketer) Scottish cricketer
 Neil McCallum (footballer, born 1868) (died 1920), Scottish international footballer
 Neil McCallum (footballer, born 1987), Scottish footballer (St. Johnstone)